George Martin (25 July 1845 — 2 September 1900) was an English cricketer who played for Nottinghamshire. He was born and died in Nottingham.

Martin made his debut first-class appearance in 1870 for Nottinghamshire against Yorkshire, making his debut in the same Nottinghamshire team for which future Test cricketer John Selby was making his first-class debut. Martin scored 15 runs in the match.

Martin made his second and final first-class appearance for an All England XI against Yorkshire, though he was bowled out for a duck in both innings, by future England Test cricketers Allen Hill and George Ulyett respectively.

External links
George Martin at Cricket Archive 

1845 births
1900 deaths
English cricketers
Nottinghamshire cricketers
All-England Eleven cricketers
Cricketers from Nottingham
Wicket-keepers